Five Brushstrokes is a 1984 sculpture from the Brushstrokes series by Roy Lichtenstein that was fabricated in 2010 and acquired by the New Orleans Museum of Art in 2013. It was installed in a fountain at the entrance of the museum in City Park. The painted and fabricated aluminum sculpture is a gift of Sydney and Walda Besthoff and Partial Gift of the Roy Lichtenstein Foundation.

Notes

External links
Lichtenstein Foundation public sculpture page

1984 sculptures
Aluminium sculptures
Sculptures by Roy Lichtenstein
Sculptures in Louisiana